Phil Lane (born May 29, 1992) is an American professional ice hockey forward. He is currently playing with the SønderjyskE of the Metal Ligaen. Lane was selected by the Phoenix Coyotes in the 2nd round (52nd overall) of the 2010 NHL Entry Draft.

Playing career
Lane played three seasons (2009 – 2012) of major junior hockey in the Ontario Hockey League (OHL) with the Brampton Battalion, scoring 50 goals and 57 assists for 107 points, while earning 259 penalty minutes, in 171 OHL games played.

On May 29, 2012, the Phoenix Coyotes signed Lane to a three-year entry-level contract. At the conclusion of his NHL contract, Lane remained within the Coyotes organization agreeing to a one-year AHL deal with new AHL affiliate, the Springfield Falcons.

As a free agent over the summer and unable to secure a contract within the AHL, Lane signed his first contract with the ECHL, agreeing to a deal with the Adirondack Thunder on October 12, 2016. In an injury plagued 2016–17 season, Lane tallied 10 goals in 26 games.

On September 5, 2017, Lane's rights were traded by the Thunder to the Atlanta Gladiators in exchange for Eric Neiley. He subsequently agreed to a one-year deal with the club.

As a free agent on June 15, 2018, Lane secured a one-year contract abroad with Norwegian outfit, the Stavanger Oilers of the GET-ligaen.

Career statistics

References

External links

1992 births
Living people
Adirondack Thunder players
Arizona Coyotes draft picks
Atlanta Gladiators players
Binghamton Devils players
Brampton Battalion players
Cleveland Monsters players
Milwaukee Admirals players
Ontario Junior Hockey League players
Portland Pirates players
Springfield Falcons players
Stavanger Oilers players
SønderjyskE Ishockey players
American men's ice hockey right wingers